Philip Raymond Hurlic (December 20, 1927 – July 7, 2014) was an American child actor.

Biography
Hurlic appeared in a number of films in the 1930s and early 1940s. Hurlic's income from his film work was used to support his East Los Angeles family. Hurlic's earliest roles were as a toddler in the Baby Burlesks series, which starred a pre-fame Shirley Temple. His largest roles in film include Little Jim in The Adventures of Tom Sawyer (1938), Verman Diggs in the Penrod films, and Zeke in Zenobia (1939). He also appeared in a number of Our Gang comedies alongside another child actor from his neighborhood, Buckwheat (Billie Thomas).

He retired from film business in 1942 after 30 films. According to Hurlic's daughter Zee, Hurlic died peacefully on July 7, 2014 surrounded by his family.

Filmography

References

External links

1927 births
2014 deaths
African-American male actors
American male child actors
People from East Los Angeles, California
African-American male child actors
20th-century African-American people
21st-century African-American people